It's About Luv is the first solo album by Bad Brains lead singer H.R. (the band is also known as Human Rights). It was first released as an LP by Olive Tree Records (H.R.'s own label) in 1985 and reissued in 1986 by SST Records (#SST 179).

Overview 
This album consists of reggae, hardcore punk and jazz-funk songs. It was released after the first break up of the Bad Brains following a European Tour.

The cover art of It's About Luv shows the lion of Judah, the star of David, and pot leaves, that express H.R. Rastafari beliefs.

Track listing 

 Roots    
 It'll Be Alright    
 We're Gonna Get You / Heaven Forbid    
 Let's Have A Revolution    
 Who Loves You Girl?    
 It's About Luv    
 Happy Birthday My Son    
 Free Our Mind

Personnel 

 Vocals - H.R.
 Guitar - David Jordan
 Drums - Earl Hudson
 Producer - David Byers
 Bass Guitar- Jose Juda II Gonzalez

Album release 
  It's About Luv, LP, Olive Tree Records, #101, 1985.
  It's About Luv, LP, SST Records, #SST 179, 1987.
  It's About Luv, CD Mini, SST Records, #SST CD 179, 1987.

References

External links 
 "HR It's About Luv" on discogs.com 

1985 albums
SST Records albums
H.R. albums